Lorne Alexander Joseph Stamler (born August 9, 1951) is a Canadian former professional ice hockey forward who played 116 games in the National Hockey League for the Los Angeles Kings, Toronto Maple Leafs, and Winnipeg Jets between 1976 and 1980. The rest of his career, which lasted from 1974 to 1984, was spent in the minor leagues.

Career statistics

Regular season and playoffs

Awards and honors

References

External links
 

1951 births
Living people
Canadian ice hockey forwards
Fort Worth Texans players
Indianapolis Checkers (CHL) players
Los Angeles Kings draft picks
Los Angeles Kings players
Michigan Tech Huskies men's ice hockey players
New Brunswick Hawks players
Ice hockey people from Winnipeg
Springfield Indians players
Toronto Maple Leafs players
Toronto Marlboros players
Tulsa Oilers (1964–1984) players
Winnipeg Jets (1979–1996) players